Intimate is a studio album by Smokey Robinson, released in 1999 on Motown Records. The album rose to No. 28 on the Billboard Top R&B/Hip-Hop Albums chart.

It was nominated for a Grammy Award for Best Traditional R&B Vocal Performance.

Overview
The album was his first in over seven years and marked a return to Motown Records. Artists such as The Emotions and Gerald Albright guested on the album.

The album had two singles: "Easy to Love" and "Sleepin' In". Music videos were made for both singles.

Critical reception

Alan Light for Vibe feels the album relies "too heavily on dated synthesizer washes and 'romantic' tinkly percussion", but Robinson's voice is "just as lovely, just as pure and clean, as ever." Andrew Hamilton of AllMusic doesn't think Intimate rates with his albums from the 1970s, calling the results "merely adequate" but says it "is a fine comeback by Mr. Motown."

Track listing
All tracks composed by Smokey Robinson and Michael Stokes; except where indicated
"Sleepin' In" – 4:07
"Easy to Love" (Smokey Robinson) – 4:30
"Love Love Again" (David Foster, Junior Miles, Bruce Roberts) – 4:12
"Intimate" – 4:36
"I'm the One" (Berry Gordy, Jr., Michael Lovesmith) – 4:02
"Just Let Me Love You" (Berry Gordy, Jr., Michael Lovesmith) – 4:04
"All of Mine" – 3:50
"The Bottom Line" – 3:54
"Feelings Flowing" – 4:13
"Ready to Roll" (Berry Gordy, Jr., Michael Lovesmith) – 3:48
"Tu Me Besas Muy Rico" – 5:13
"Intimate" (Reprise) – 1:22

References

Smokey Robinson albums
1999 albums
Albums produced by Smokey Robinson
Motown albums